Cape Aya is a rocky promontory jutting out into the Black Sea southeast of Balaklava. This 13-km-long offspur of the Crimean Mountains separates Laspi Bay (to the east) from Balaklava Bay (to the west).

The name of the cape derives from "holy one" in Greek, “Άγια”.

The headland is full of grottoes; it is protected as a national zakaznik.

A storm off Cape Aya is the subject of one of Ivan Aivazovsky's paintings. A Soviet guided missile system was located on Cape Aya.

Viktor Yanukovych, the former President of Ukraine, ordered the construction of a luxurious private residence on Cape Aya. The "New Mezhyhyria", or popularly known as "Mezhyhirya 2" closed locals off from the coast, and was still unfinished when the Revolution of Dignity ousted Yanukovych from his post.

References

Landforms of Sevastopol
Headlands of Crimea
Headlands of Ukraine